The Nocte Award is a Spanish literary award presented by Nocte (Spanish Horror Writers Association) to those books worthy of mention published in Spain in the previous year, and also to those initiatives and careers that then and now dignify horror literature.

2011 Nocte Awards
 Best Spanish short story: “El hombre revenido” by Emilio Bueso (Aquelarre; Salto de Página).
 Best Spanish novel: Y pese a todo... by Juande Garduño (Dolmen).
 Best foreign novel: El circo de la familia Pilo by Will Elliott (La Factoría).
 Honourable mention: Pablo Mazo, Antonio Rómar and Salto de Página for Aquelarre project.

2010 Nocte Awards
 Best Spanish short story: “El laberinto de la araña” by José Miguel Vilar-Bou (Cuentos inhumanos; Saco de huesos).
 Best Spanish novel: Fin by David Monteagudo (Editorial Acantilado).
 Best foreign short story: “La foto de la clase de este año” by Dan Simmons (Zombies; Minotauro).
 Best foreign novel: Una oración por los que mueren by Stewart O'Nan (La Factoría).

2009 Nocte Awards
 Best Spanish short story: “Lluvia sangrienta” by Roberto Malo. (La luz del diablo; Mira editores).
 Best foreign short story: “El mejor cuento de terror” by Joe Hill (Fantasmas; Suma).
 Best Spanish novel: Rojo alma, negro sombra by Ismael Martínez Biurrun (451 editores).
 Best foreign novel: Déjame entrar by John Ajvide Lindqvist (Espasa-Calpe).
 Honourable mention: Francisco Torres Oliver, for his translation career.

References 

Spanish speculative fiction awards
Spanish literary awards
Awards established in 2009
2009 establishments in Spain
Horror fiction awards